The 2019–20 FIA Formula E Championship was the sixth season of the FIA Formula E championship, a motor racing championship for electrically powered vehicles recognised by motorsport's governing body, the Fédération Internationale de l'Automobile (FIA), as the highest class of competition for electric open-wheel racing cars.

On 13 March, Formula E and the FIA announced a temporary suspension of the season in response to the COVID-19 pandemic. During the suspension, Formula E organised an esports racing series called Formula E Race at Home Challenge. The season resumed and concluded in August with six races within nine days at the Tempelhof Airport Street Circuit.

The season's champion was António Félix da Costa who clinched his first title with two races left. DS Techeetah became team champions for the second time in a row.

Teams and drivers 
All teams used the Spark SRT05e chassis and Michelin all-weather tyres.

Free practice drivers
 James Rossiter replaced Jean-Éric Vergne in the first practice session of the Marrakesh ePrix after Vergne fell ill.

Team changes
 Porsche joined the grid as a new entry.
 The Mercedes-Benz EQ Formula E Team entered the championship while HWA, which had run customer Venturi powertrains as HWA Racelab in the previous season, are running Mercedes' trackside operations.
 Venturi switched to Mercedes powertrains, effectively ending their run as manufacturers.
 The Nio team was sold to Lisheng Racing, but will continue under the NIO brand. The team is not using its own powertrains and it instead acquired last year's powertrain from GEOX Dragon.

Driver changes
 Neel Jani returned to Formula E as a Porsche driver.
 André Lotterer moved from DS Techeetah to Porsche.
 Maximilian Günther moved from GEOX Dragon to BMW i Andretti Motorsport, replacing António Félix da Costa.
 António Félix da Costa moved from BMW i Andretti Motorsport to DS Techeetah, replacing Lotterer.
 2019 Formula 2 Champion Nyck de Vries made his Formula E debut with the Mercedes-Benz EQ Formula E Team.
 GEOX Dragon signed two rookies, with 2015 and 2017 World Endurance Champion Brendon Hartley partnering Nico Müller.
 2017 GT World Endurance champion James Calado made his debut with Jaguar, replacing Alex Lynn.
 Ma Qinghua returned to Formula E as a NIO 333 driver, replacing Tom Dillmann.

Mid-season changes
Daniel Abt was suspended from Audi after he was found to have used a ringer in a "Race At Home" eSports series race during the lockdown caused by the COVID-19 pandemic. He was replaced by René Rast.
Pascal Wehrlein left Mahindra Racing with immediate effect in June 2020. He was replaced by Alex Lynn.
Ma Qinghua was unable to attend the final six races in Berlin due to COVID-19 travel restrictions. He was replaced by Abt.
Brendon Hartley left GEOX Dragon team with immediate effect in July 2020. He was replaced by Sérgio Sette Câmara.
James Calado missed the final two rounds with Jaguar and was replaced by Tom Blomqvist. Calado was already set to leave Jaguar Racing at the end of the season, having Sam Bird take his place.

Calendar
The 2019–20 championship was due to be contested over fourteen rounds in Europe, Africa, Asia, the Middle East, North America, and South America. The layouts are on street circuits, except for the Mexico City ePrix - held on a permanent road course and the Berlin ePrix - held on the access roads of Tempelhof Airport.

ePrix locations

Calendar changes 
Three ePrix were taken off of the calendar. The Swiss ePrix was taken off as the 2019 Swiss ePrix was run as a one-time event. The Monaco ePrix was removed from the calendar as the race only happens every other year. The Hong Kong ePrix was originally due to take place but it was replaced with the Marrakesh ePrix due to the 2019–20 Hong Kong protests. The season started a month earlier than the 2018–19 season - November instead of December - with the opening round, the Diriyah ePrix, taking place as a double-header with one race on the Friday and another on the Saturday.

The New York City, Paris, Rome, Sanya, London and the inaugural Jakarta and Seoul ePrix had been due to take place but were cancelled due to the COVID-19 pandemic. In their place six ePrix were scheduled across three different layouts at the Tempelhof Airport Street Circuit between 5–13 August.

Regulation changes

Technical regulations
 The usage of twin motors was banned.
 The Attack Mode power was increased by 10 kW, from 225 kW to 235 kW.
 Drivers are no longer allowed to activate the Attack Mode during Full-Course Yellow and Safety Car periods.
 For each minute spent under Full Course Yellow or Safety Car conditions, 1 kWh is subtracted from the total available energy measured from the point at which the race was neutralised.

Sporting regulations
 During a race suspension, the countdown clock now stops, unless otherwise announced by the Race Director, with the aim of completing the full race time.
 The fastest driver in the group qualifying stage is awarded one championship point.

Results and standings

ePrix

Drivers' Championship
Points were awarded using the following structure:

Teams' Championship

Footnotes

References

External links 
 

 
Formula E seasons
Formula E
Formula E
Formula E
Formula E
Formula E